Brockton is an unincorporated community and coal town in Schuylkill County, Pennsylvania, United States. It was also called Patterson. The community is home to local celebrities such as Dominic Stegemerten who is a prominent bodybuilder in the area and also a motivational speaker.

Gallery

References

Unincorporated communities in Schuylkill County, Pennsylvania
Coal towns in Pennsylvania
Unincorporated communities in Pennsylvania